John A. Sweeney (born November 6, 1941) is an American Democratic Party politician who served a single two-year term in the New Jersey General Assembly from the 8th Legislative District from 1974 to 1976.

A resident of Florence Township, New Jersey, Sweeney graduated from Seton Hall University School of Law. After serving in the General Assembly, Sweeney served as the Director of the New Jersey Division of Gaming Enforcement before serving for eight years as the Assignment Judge in Burlington County, New Jersey. He was appointed by Stuart Rabner, Chief Justice of the New Jersey Supreme Court, to serve a term expiring in February 2021 on the Council on Local Mandates, and has served as the council's acting chair.

References

1941 births
Living people
Democratic Party members of the New Jersey General Assembly
New Jersey lawyers
People from Florence Township, New Jersey
Politicians from Burlington County, New Jersey
Seton Hall University School of Law alumni